Pleasant Hill Church, also known as Keeps Creek Church, is a historic one-room country church located at the junction of County Roads 400S and 675W, in Clinton Township, Cass County, Indiana. It was built in 1875, and is a red brick building, with Italianate style design elements.  It has a front gable roof and white clapboard belfry.  It measures 50 feet by 33 feet. It was originally used as a meeting place for three different denominations.

It was listed on the National Register of Historic Places in 1995.

References

Churches in Cass County, Indiana
Churches on the National Register of Historic Places in Indiana
Italianate architecture in Indiana
Churches completed in 1875
National Register of Historic Places in Cass County, Indiana
Italianate church buildings in the United States